WYIR-LP (96.9 FM, "Your New Rock Alternative") is a low-power FM radio station broadcasting a Christian rock music format. Licensed to Baugh City, Indiana, United States, the station serves the Evansville area. The station is currently owned by Youth Incorporated of Southern Indiana.

History
The Federal Communications Commission issued a construction permit for the station on June 18, 2003. The station was issued the WYIR-LP call sign on August 21, 2003, and received its license to cover on July 19, 2005.

References

External links

 

YIR-LP
Radio stations established in 2005
Contemporary Christian radio stations in the United States
YIR-LP